Alexander Moissi (2 April 1879 – 22/23 March 1935) was an Austrian stage actor of Albanian origin.

Early years

Moissi was born in Trieste to Moisi Moisiu from Kavaye, Ottoman Empire (today Kavajë in Albania), who was a rich Albanian merchant of oil and wheat, and an Arbëresh mother, Amalia de Rada, from Trieste, daughter of a Florentine doctor. 

After an international childhood in Trieste, Durrës and Graz, the 20-year-old Alexander settled with his mother and two sisters in Vienna. He began vocal studies and applied for a drama training at the k.k. Hofburgtheater, but was rejected due to his strong Italian accent and had to confine himself to non-speaking roles. It was his performance in Molière's Tartuffe of the Burgtheater 1899/1900 season, which stunned the renowned Austrian actor Josef Kainz, playing the lead role. 

With Kainz' encouragement and support, Moissi's career as one of the great European stage actors of the early-20th century began. The following year took him to the New German Theatre in Prague and in 1903 he joined the ensemble of the Deutsches Theater in Berlin, where he became a protégé of the influential director Max Reinhardt.

Together with Rudolph Schildkraut he performed in Reinhardt's staging of Shakespeare's The Merchant of Venice, now emphasizing his melodious speech, which despite first damning reviews finally made him a star. Moissi and the Reinhardt ensemble toured the Russia in 1911 and was acclaimed in Saint Petersburg by critic and dramatist Anatoly Lunacharsky for his interpretation of Sophocles' Oedipus. Traveling across Europe and the Americas, his most famous role was Fedya in Tolstoy's The Living Corpse — performed more than 1400 times by him. In 1914, Moisiu acquired German citizenship to become a volunteer in World War I, and during the German Revolution of 1918–19 joined the Marxist Spartacus League.

In 1920 he played the leading part in the first performance of Hugo von Hofmannsthal's Jedermann adaption of The Somonyng of Everyman at the Salzburg Festival. However, Moissi did not keep up with the German Expressionist and epic theatre movement initiated by directors like Erwin Piscator and Bertolt Brecht. He finally left Germany after the Nazi Machtergreifung in 1933 and was offered Albanian citizenship by King Zog.

Alexander Moissi died of pneumonia on 22 or 23 March 1935, most likely in Vienna (other sources claim 23 March 1935 in Lugano). He was cremated at Feuerhalle Simmering and his ashes are buried at the Morcote cemetery overlooking Lake Lugano in Switzerland.

Work
In Berlin, Moissi was acclaimed for his 1906 performance of Oswald in Ibsen's Ghosts and in the premiere of Wedekind's Spring Awakening. His interpretations in the leading roles of Hamlet, Œdipus, Faust, and many others, were celebrated at the time, as were his voice and emotional range. Beside the Deutsches Theater, he performed at the Vienna Volkstheater and the Theater in der Josefstadt. Though primarily a stage actor, he appeared in ten film productions from 1910 to 1935, of which seven were silent, most notably in The Student of Prague  (1913).

Although a Christian, Moissi was often labeled as Jewish or of at least partial Jewish descent due to his name (which translates to "Moses") and his friendly relationship with fellow Jewish actors at a time when anti-semitism was on the rise. ("Moisiu" is a common Albanian name and rarely indicates Jewish ancestry.) Moissi strongly rebuked his critics in the German press challenging the Christian world to live up to its ideals and desist from persecuting the Jews noting that: "Where Jews are concerned Christian morality, humaneness, and values are trampled underfoot" and "The road of anti-semitism is a throwback to the dark days of the Middle Ages."

Legacy

Streets are named after Alexander Moissi in Berlin, Salzburg and Vienna, where also a monument was unveiled in 2005. In Albania he is highly venerated as a most important national actor. In his honour, the drama school of the Academy of Music and Arts in Tirana as well as the university and the city theatre of Durrës were named "Aleksandër Moisiu".

In his father's hometown of Kavajë, the main public high-school and the local theater are also named after him. The 60th anniversary of his death was remembered in Albania in 1995 with an "Artistic Year" dedicated to him; it was sponsored by the Aleksandër Moisiu Foundation.

Personal life
Moissi was married twice:
His first marriage was to Maria Moissi (née Marie Urfus) who was from Vienna. She founded the drama school Schauspielschule Maria Moissi Berlin where her husband also taught. They had one daughter, Beate Moissi, (born 1908) Alexander Moissi had another daughter with Herta Hambach, Bettina Moissi (born 1923). Bettina would later marry the Jewish American art collector Heinz Berggruen in 1959. One of their two children, Nicolas Berggruen, is a billionaire financier and art collector, while the other, Olivier, is an art historian.
His second marriage was to German actress Johanna Terwin. 
 German actor Gedeon Burkhard is Moissi's great-grandson.

Quotes
 "The voice and gestures of Moisiu presented us with something hitherto unseen on the European stage." – Franz Kafka
 "Hamlet is written for Moissi, and Moissi was uniquely born to interpret the Prince of Denmark." – Max Brod
 "I salute Aleksandër Moisiu to whom I am forever grateful, as one of the most brilliant interpreters of my characters." – Luigi Pirandello
 "Man of the South, always Man of the South. In order not to be frozen he takes the sun of his country whenever he goes. Whenever you are with him you'll learn something new about life in this world." – Stefan Zweig

Selected filmography

 The Night of Queen Isabeau (1920)
 The Royal Box (1929)

References

External links
 Spirit of Albania biography (Archived 2009-10-25)
 
 
 Photographs of Alexander Moissi
 Moissi speaks Hamlet soliloquy 

1879 births
1935 deaths
Austrian Christians
Austrian expatriates in Germany
Austrian male film actors
Austrian male silent film actors
Austrian male stage actors
Austrian people of Albanian descent
Austrian people of Arbëreshë descent
Austro-Hungarian people
Burials in Switzerland
Deaths from pneumonia in Austria
German military personnel of World War I
Italian Austro-Hungarians
People from Austrian Littoral
Actors from Kavajë
Moisiu family
Actors from Trieste
Male actors from Vienna
People of the German Revolution of 1918–1919
People with acquired German citizenship
20th-century Austrian male actors